The Film and Publication Board, (FPB / stylized as fpb) is a content-classification and regulation authority in South Africa, operating under the Minister of Communications and Digital Technologies. The FPB was established in 1996 under the Films and Publications Act, ostensibly to tackle issues of child pornography and child abuse, as well as to provide ratings to publicly consumed media such as movies, music and television programs.  Under these directives, its mandate can be considered one of state censorship.

Overview

History
The Film and Publication Board was established directly under the directive set out in the Films and Publications Act of 1996, shortly after South Africa achieved independence from apartheid rule.  The Board's function would be to receive complaints - or applications to evaluate - a film or publication, to classify it according to its suitability for different audiences.  These publications could include movies, television programs, computer games, and music.

The classification of a film or publication would trigger various prohibitions on possessing, exhibiting, distributing or advertising the film or publication.  Different ratings were devised, the most serious of which was "X18", which prohibited anyone without a specific license from distributing the content, which had to be conducted within "adult premises".

Certain key exemptions from prohibitions were made to the scientific community (in regard to bona fide scientific, documentary, dramatic, artistic, literary or religious films and publications), and the media (in that those holding a broadcasting license were exempt from the duty to apply for classification).

An appeals process was also defined under the Act, allowing rulings made by the FPB to be contested and challenged.

On 3 March 2020, Netflix agreed to obey the FPB's classification rules in the distribution of content in South Africa.

Ratings

The FPB has the following rating guideline:

Additionally, the FPB provides the following content classifications:

Criticism

The Spear

In 2012, the Goodman Gallery in Cape Town, showcased a painting by artist Brett Murray. It depicted President Jacob Zuma in a pose reminiscent of Lenin, but with fully exposed genitalia.  The painting drew swift condemnation from the ANC ruling party, who condemned the artist, the artwork, and all media outlets who had published images of the painting.
Shortly after, the Film and Publication board sent five assessors to provide a rating for the artwork - a move that was harshly criticized for being well outside its mandate, and beyond the remit of the purpose of the FPB.  Despite this, the FPB issued an "16N" rating, which meant that the Gallery could no longer publicly show the painting if there were children in the building.

During the classification proceedings, there were allegations that the FPB was acting outside its statutory remit, and that specific members had made statements or asked questions implying that it was entitled to censor political opinions and restrict freedom of the press.

This decision was later appealed following a public backlash, and amidst accusations of state-led censorship.  Upon appeal in October 2012, the FPB set aside its original rating, thereby effectively de-classifying the painting.  This had taken place after the painting was famously defaced and sold, which rendered the ruling moot on practical terms.

Online Regulation Bill 

In March 2015, the FPB gazetted a notice inviting public comment on a Draft Online Regulation policy, which sought sweeping new powers to police and regulate all aspects of content on the internet.  In this draft policy, the FPB sought to classify all manner of content, including, for instance, user-submitted videos to sites such as YouTube, which would require all such content to first be classified by the FPB at a charge and labeled as FPB-approved before it would be allowed to be legally published online.

Specifically, the following sections from the draft detail the broadness of the powers FPB seek:

 5.1.1 Any person who intends to distribute any film, game, or certain publication in the Republic of South Africa shall first comply with section 18(1) of the Act by applying, in the prescribed manner, for registration as film or game and publications distributor.
 5.1.2 In the event that such film, game or publication is in a digital form or format intended for distribution online using the internet or other mobile platforms, the distributor may bring an application to the Board for the conclusion of an online distribution agreement, in terms of which the distributor, upon payment of the fee prescribed from time to time by the Minister of DOC as the Executive Authority, may classify its online content on behalf of the Board, using the Board's classification Guidelines and the Act

The Electronic Frontier Foundation described the proposed legislation as follows:

The EFF also went on to point out that the FPB had effectively put the burden on South African ISPs to remove offending content, or replace said content with FPB-approved (and labelled) content, even on platforms such as YouTube, Vimeo and Vine.

In the response to what is understood as one of the most draconian pieces of internet legislation seen in the world, the FPB has been on the receiving end of a growing online backlash, proliferated through social media such as Facebook and Twitter.  In particular, the Right2Know coalition - who advocate open government and whistleblowing - have championed the cause against FPB's draft proposal.

References

External links
 

1996 establishments in South Africa
Censorship in South Africa
Cinema of South Africa
Communications in South Africa
South Africa
Communications
Entertainment rating organizations
Mass media in South Africa
Motion picture rating systems
Video game content ratings systems
Video game organizations